Pirot Fortress or Momchilov grad (Momchilo's fortress, Serbian and Bulgarian: Момчилов град) is situated in Pirot, Serbia. It was built in the 14th century by Bulgarian brigand and local ruler Momchil. In 1344, the regency concluded a further alliance with Bulgaria, which required the surrender of Philippopolis (Plovdiv) and nine other towns in northern Thrace along the river Evros. Nevertheless, after their occupation, Ivan Alexander refrained from direct action against John VI Kantakouzenos' forces operating in southern and eastern Thrace. At the same time, Momchil, a former brigand whom Kantakouzenos had entrusted with control over the Merope (region)  in the Rhodope mountains, switched over to the regency. It was supposed to serve as a defense against the Turks along the ancient Roman road called Via Militaris (Military Road) which connected Belgrade to Constantinople.

Pirot Fortress was declared Monument of Culture of Great Importance in 1979, and it is protected by Republic of Serbia.

See also 
 Monuments of Culture of Great Importance
 Tourism in Serbia

References

External links 

 Association of fortresses and remnants of fortified towns in Serbia, Pirot
 Pirotski grad SANU web-site, at www.spomenicikulture.mi.sanu.ac.rs 
 Pirot.Org Web portal and forum of municipality of Pirot 

Medieval Serbian architecture
Forts in Serbia
Cultural Monuments of Great Importance (Serbia)
Buildings and structures in Pirot